This is a list of physics journals with existing articles on Wikipedia. The list is organized by subfields of physics.

By subject

General

Astrophysics

Atomic, molecular, and optical physics
 European Physical Journal D
 Journal of Physics B
 Laser Physics
 Molecular Physics
 Physical Review A

Plasmas

Measurement 
 Measurement Science and Technology
 Metrologia
 Review of Scientific Instruments

Nuclear and particle physics

Optics

Computational physics
 Computational Materials Science
 Computer Physics Communications
 International Journal of Modern Physics C (computational physics, physical computations)
 Journal of Computational Physics
 Physical Review E, section E13
  Communications in Computational Physics

Condensed matter and materials science

Low temperature physics
 Journal of Low Temperature Physics
 Low Temperature Physics

Chemical physics
 Chemical Physics Letters
 Journal of Chemical Physics
 Journal of Physical Chemistry A
 Journal of Physical Chemistry B
 Journal of Physical Chemistry C
 Journal of Physical Chemistry Letters
 Physical Chemistry Chemical Physics

Soft matter physics
 European Physical Journal E
 Journal of Polymer Science Part B
 Soft Matter

Medical physics
 Australasian Physical & Engineering Sciences in Medicine
 BMC Medical Physics
 Bioelectromagnetics
 Health Physics
 Journal of Medical Physics
 Magnetic Resonance in Medicine
 Medical Physics
 Physics in Medicine and Biology

Biological physics
 Annual Review of Biophysics
 Biochemical and Biophysical Research Communications
 Biophysical Journal
 Biophysical Reviews and Letters
 Doklady Biochemistry and Biophysics
 European Biophysics Journal
 International Journal of Biological Macromolecules
 Physical Biology
 Radiation and Environmental Biophysics

Statistical and nonlinear physics

Theoretical and mathematical physics

Quantum information 
 Quantum
 Journal of Quantum Information Science
 International Journal of Quantum Information
 npj Quantum Information

Geophysics and planetology 
 Atmospheric Chemistry and Physics
 Geophysical & Astrophysical Fluid Dynamics formerly Geophysical Fluid Dynamics
 Geophysical Journal International formerly Geophysical Journal of the Royal Astronomical Society
 Geophysical Research Letters
 Icarus
 Journal of Geophysical Research
 Physics of the Earth and Planetary Interiors
 Planetary and Space Science
 Reviews of Geophysics

Acoustics 
 Journal of Sound and Vibration
 Journal of the Acoustical Society of America
 Journal of Theoretical and Computational Acoustics

See also 
 List of scientific journals
 List of fluid mechanics journals
 List of materials science journals

External links 
 EPS recognized physics journals

Physics
 
Journals